Mario S. Tiziani (born July 17, 1970) is an American professional golfer.

College career 
Tiziani was born in Ironwood, Michigan. Playing golf for the Wisconsin Badgers, he was Big Ten Conference freshman of the year.

Professional career 
On his 12th attempt, Tiziani qualified for the PGA Tour. In his only full season on the PGA Tour in 2005, his best finish was T-12 at the Southern Farm Bureau Classic. He played full-time on the Nationwide Tour in 2006 and 2007, but his best result came in 2005 – tied for second at the LaSalle Bank Open.

On the Canadian Tour, he won the 2003 Northern Ontario Open and also won the 2002 Panama Open, an unofficial event.

He also won the 2002 Wisconsin State Open.

Personal life 
He is brother-in-law to pro golfer Steve Stricker and son of Dennis Tiziani.

Professional wins

Canadian Tour wins
2003 Northern Ontario Open

Other wins
2002 Wisconsin State Open, Panama Open

See also 
 2004 PGA Tour Qualifying School graduates

References

External links 

American male golfers
Wisconsin Badgers men's golfers
PGA Tour golfers
Golfers from Michigan
Golfers from Wisconsin
People from Ironwood, Michigan
1970 births
Living people